Growing Up is the debut studio album by South Korean singer-songwriter IU. It was released on April 23, 2009, as a follow-up to her 2008 debut mini-album Lost and Found. Two of the album's 16 tracks, "Boo" and "You Know (있잖아) (Rock Ver.)", were released as singles.

Background

Growing Up consists of 16 tracks. The album's title track "Boo" is composed by Han Sang-Won, who is best known for his melodies in songs "On days when I miss you" by Park Ji-Hun of V.O.S., and "Don't go, don't go, don't go" by Wanted. "Boo" is about a "charming friend of the opposite gender"; the lyrics tell the story of a haughty girl who does not care for the men around her. She falls in love with a boy to whom she had never given much thought. The follow-up song from the album, "You Know (Rock Ver.)", is the rock version of IU's song "You Know", which was more popular than the original version. The song portrays a young girl as she candidly expresses her feelings to the person with whom she is infatuated.

Music videos
On May 16, 2011, the music videos for "Boo" and "You Know (있잖아) (Rock ver.)" were released through Loen Entertainment's official YouTube channel.

Promotion
On April 23, 2009, IU began her first week of promotions through KBS's Music Bank. IU chose "Hey (있잖아) (Rock version)" as her follow-up single and performed it on various music programs after promotions for "Boo" had finished.

Track listing

Charts

Notes

References

2009 debut albums
IU (singer) albums
Korean-language albums
Kakao M albums